Ovens (or The Ovens) was an electoral district of the Legislative Assembly in the Australian state of Victoria from 1856 to 1927. It was based in northern Victoria, bordered by the Ovens River in the south-west and included the town of Beechworth, Victoria.

The district of Ovens was one of the initial districts of the first Victorian Legislative Assembly, 1856. It was defined in the Victorian Constitution Act 1855 (taking effect at the 1856 elections) as: 

Ovens was superseded by Electoral district of Wangaratta and Ovens in 1927.

Members for Ovens
One member initially, two from the increase in members of 1859. One again from the redistribution of 1889 when the Electoral district of Wangaratta and Rutherglen, amongst others, was created.

Election results

References

Former electoral districts of Victoria (Australia)
1856 establishments in Australia
1927 disestablishments in Australia